Busengo is a settlement in the Western Region of Uganda. It is one of the urban centers in  Kisoro District. The town lies across the international border from Busengo, Democratic Republic of the Congo.

Location

The coordinates of Busengo, Uganda are 01°09'43.0"S, 29°35'03.0"E (Latitude:-1.161944; Longitude:29.584167).

Overview
At Busengo, Uganda the major road continues into the Democratic Republic of the Congo, through Busengo, DRC and it joins the N2 Road in Rutshuru. A smaller road travels north in the DR Congo from Busengo, Uganda, re-enters Uganda and loops back to Kisoro Town, passing to the east of Lake Mutanda.

Busengo, Uganda is the location of Busengo Primary School.

See also
List of cities and towns in Uganda

References

External links
Kisoro District Homepage

Populated places in Western Region, Uganda
Democratic Republic of the Congo–Uganda border crossings
Kisoro District